The Cioiana is a left tributary of the river Jiu in Romania. It discharges into the Jiu in Peșteana-Jiu.

References

Rivers of Romania
Rivers of Gorj County